Kukhtym is a rural locality (a settlement) in Dobryansky District, Perm Krai, Russia. The population was 10 as of 2010. There are 11 streets.

Geography 
Kukhtym is located 35 km northeast of Dobryanka (the district's administrative centre) by road. Kukhtym (railway station settlement) is the nearest rural locality.

References 

Rural localities in Dobryansky District